Neal Rijkenberg is the minister of finance of Eswatini since November 2018. 

His family moved from South Africa to Swaziland in 1970. Rijkenberg previously served as CEO of timber producer Montigny investments and co-founded Bulembu Ministries Eswatini. A self-described proponent of a free-market economy, he supports slashing labour and competition regulations. In February 2020, he cut the country's corporate tax rate from 27.5% to 12.5%.

References 

Finance Ministers of Eswatini
Government ministers of Eswatini
Swazi businesspeople
Swazi people of European descent
Year of birth missing (living people)
Living people